Meridian Street is the primary north–south street in Indianapolis, Indiana.

US 31 formerly ran along North Meridian Street for much of its length in the city of Indianapolis, before being re-routed to a segment of Interstate 465. Meridian Street serves as the axis separating east addresses from west addresses, and intersects Monument Circle and Washington Street in downtown. North of downtown, Meridian continues through several prominent city neighborhoods, such as the Midtown commercial district, the Old Northside, Herron-Morton, Butler–Tarkington, Meridian-Kessler, and Arden, and the towns of Meridian Hills and Williams Creek.

Meridian Street also passes through several historic districts: the North Meridian Street Historic District, the Old Northside Historic District, the Shortridge–Meridian Street Apartments Historic District, the Washington Street–Monument Circle Historic District, and the Indianapolis Union Station-Wholesale District.

In 1919, property owners on  Meridian Street from Monument Circle to the Central Canal proposed converting the street into a boulevard and putting it under the jurisdiction of the parks board to preserve its residential character. However, the increased demand for commercial property for an expanding downtown led to the proposal being defeated as property owners in the southern portion of the proposed boulevard sold their property to business interests. Nevertheless, in the early 1920s the portion of the street from Fall Creek to the canal was transferred to the parks board and a  setback for new construction was imposed. In conjunction with the original proposal, an unsuccessful attempt was made to change the name of the street to Lincoln Boulevard in order to honor Abraham Lincoln in the same way that Washington Street honored George Washington.

North of 40th Street to 57th Street, Meridian Street is considered to be among the most prestigious residential streets in Indiana. Some of the most impressive residential architecture in the United States can be found here, in a variety of architectural styles. The current Governor's Mansion can be found here, as well as the house that served as Governor's Mansion prior to the current house. The North Meridian Street Historic District is among the most affluent urban neighborhoods in the U.S., with a mean household income of $102,599 in 2017.

North of Indianapolis, Meridian Street continues into the suburbs of Carmel and Westfield.

Notable addresses
Balmoral Court
Barnes and Thornburg Building
Birch Bayh Federal Building and United States Courthouse
The Blacherne
The Buckingham
Central Library
The Children's Museum of Indianapolis
Circle Centre Mall
Coulter Flats
George Stumpf House
Indiana Governor's Residence
Indiana World War Memorial Plaza
The Indianapolis Star
IU Health North Medical Center
Ivy Tech Community College of Indiana
Joseph J. Cole Jr. House
Marott Hotel
Monument Circle
Morrison Block
Saint James Court Apartments
Saints Peter and Paul Cathedral
Salesforce Tower
Schnull–Rauch House
Scottish Rite Cathedral
Second Presbyterian Church
Shortridge High School
Slippery Noodle Inn
Spink Arms Hotel
H. P. Wasson & Company Building
William N. Thompson House

References

Streets in Indianapolis